Saima Manzoor also known as Saima Waqas (born 24 March 1981) is a Pakistani badminton player. She was the bronze medalists at the 2006 South Asian Games in the mixed doubles and team events. Manzoor won the 2016 Pakistan International tournament in the women's doubles event.

Achievements

South Asian Games 
Mixed doubles

BWF International Challenge/Series 
Women's doubles

  BWF International Challenge tournament
  BWF International Series tournament
  BWF Future Series tournament

References

External links 
 

Living people
1981 births
Place of birth missing (living people)
Pakistani female badminton players
South Asian Games bronze medalists for Pakistan
South Asian Games medalists in badminton